Phi Delta Gamma of Puerto Rico is the first Puerto Rican organization of Greek letters, which was founded in the western town of Mayagüez, on April 25, 1942.

Phi Delta Gamma originated from a high school fraternity, Alpha Iota Omega, which was founded in 1939.  When the brothers of Alpha Iota Omega enrolled in the College of Agriculture and Mechanic Arts (Colegio de Agricultura y Artes Mecánicas) of Mayagüez, some were offered the opportunity to pledge one of the original Puerto Rican fraternities.  The others reunited in the house of the brothers Gilberto Oliver Padilla and Otis Oliver Padilla.  They decided to found a new fraternity on April 25, 1942, and to use the Greek letters Phi, Delta and Gamma.

The founding brothers are Gilberto Oliver Padilla, Otis Oliver Padilla, Raúl Romaguera, Ramón Antonio Frontera, Ignacio Beauchamp, José Ramón Ponce de León, Hilton Quintana, Angel Inserni, Rafael Ferrer Monge “El Cubano” (who also developed the shield, the first rulebook, and the motto of the fraternity), Rubén D’Acosta, Edgardo Olivencia, César Arana and Hernán Rodríguez.

These brothers established the first chapter as Alpha in Mayagüez. They had plans to expand the fraternity to all of Puerto Rico.  In 1944, the first Phi Delta Gamma clubhouse was established in the Méndez Vigo street of Mayagüez.

In 1945, brother Otis Oliver commended to students Juan Mari Brás and Manuel Portela Lomba to take the Phi Delta Gamma fraternity to San Juan.  They began the task of establishing the Beta chapter in the University of Puerto Rico in Río Piedras.  Some of the founding brothers of the Beta chapter are Oscar Colón, Juan Mari Brás, Jean García, Ramón Vargas, Manuel Portela Lomba and Angel Amézaga.  Thanks to this effort, the first convention of the Phi Delta Gamma was celebrated in 1945, in the Condado Hotel.

The Phi Delta Gamma members are known as "the originals", because they changed the way a traditional fraternity ought to be; also, they were the first Greek letter fraternity, which originated in western Puerto Rico: town of Mayagüez. The Phi Deltas are renowned for their friendliness and honesty. Above all, the great brotherhood among its members is very characteristic of their family activities (which involve grandparents, parents, spouses, children, grandchildren, and even great-grandchildren).

Notable members
 Juan Mari Brás, lawyer and political candidate for governor for the Puerto Rican Socialist Party
 Dr. Pío Sanchez Longo; Neurogist 
 Luis Cabrera, actor
 José Angel "Chiro" Cangiano, lawyer; entrepreneur (Ponce Lions teams); writer; brother of Milly Cangiano
 Manuel "Papo" Charbonnier, City of Río Piedras; Puerto Rico Sports Hall of Fame
 Albert Cruz, WAPA TV sports newscaster
 Alfredo Lamela Domenech, ex-professional basketball player (BSN) of Piratas de Quebradillas
 Agustín "Tito" Lara, singer
 José Ortiz, former Executive President of PRASA
 Joaquín Porrata, radio sports analyst
 Miguel Rivera, former member of Puerto Rico government 
 Manuel Díaz Saldaña, former comptroller of Puerto Rico government
 Orlando "El Zurdo" Sanchez, aka " El Playero Mayor", domino national champion
 Alfredo J. Santana Velázquez, bodybuilder with international awards
 José Canals Vidal, retired Colonel, US armed forces
 Luis "Luisito" Vigoreaux, Jr., television actor and producer
 Ernesto Quesada Ojeda, District Attorney
 Luis A. Gil Rivera, Former Class A Baseball Player, Former UPRM Softball Player
 Luis R. Soltero Harrington, Cardiovascular and Pediatric Surgeon

Past Presidents (Pasados Grandes Cancilleres)

See also
List of social fraternities and sororities

References

External links
 Hacienda Lealtad Phi Delta Gamma postmark
 www.phideltagammapr.org (offline)

Concilio Interfraternitario Puertorriqueño de la Florida
Fraternities and sororities in Puerto Rico
International student societies
1942 establishments in Puerto Rico
Latino fraternities and sororities